Nososticta solitaria is an Australian species of damselfly in the family Platycnemididae,
commonly known as the fivespot threadtail. It is found only in north-eastern Australia.

Its usual habitat is near rivers, streams and pools. The adult is a medium-sized damselfly with a length of 35 to 40mm, and wingspan similar to its length. The thorax is black with two pale green stripes.  The abdomen is dark with five prominent pale or green bands, the largest being on segments 5 and 8. The wings of the male have a yellowish tint, which may also be seen on the female. In Australia, the distribution is in suitable habitat in the north-eastern part of the continent from the tip of Cape York Peninsula to the southern Queensland border. The taxon has not been assessed in the IUCN Red List.

Gallery

See also
 List of Odonata species of Australia

References 

Platycnemididae
Odonata of Australia
Insects of Australia
Endemic fauna of Australia
Taxa named by Robert John Tillyard
Insects described in 1906
Damselflies